The 2013 Regional Municipality of Wood Buffalo municipal election was held Monday, October 21, 2013. From 1968 to 2013, provincial legislation has required every municipality to hold elections every three years. The Alberta Legislative Assembly passed a bill on December 5, 2012, amending the Local Authorities Election Act. Starting with the 2013 elections, officials are elected for a four-year term, and municipal elections are moved to a four-year cycle.

The citizens of the Regional Municipality of Wood Buffalo, Alberta, elected one mayor, ten councillors, the five Fort McMurray Public School District trustees (in Fort McMurray), five of the Northland School Division No. 61's 23 school boards (outside Fort McMurray, three or five trustees each), and the five Fort McMurray Roman Catholic Separate School District No. 32 trustees (in Fort McMurray). Wood Buffalo includes Fort McMurray, an urban service area deemed equivalent of a city.

Results
Bold indicates elected, and incumbents are italicized.

Mayor

Councillors
Council consists of ten councillors, six from Ward 1, two from Ward 2, one from Ward 3, and one from Ward 4.

Public School Trustees

References

Wood Buffalo
Regional Municipality of Wood Buffalo